Dedollarisation is a process of substituting US dollar as the currency used for (i) trading oil and/ or other commodities (i.e. petrodollar), (ii) buying US dollars for the forex reserves, (iii) bilateral trade agreements, and (iv) dollar-denominated assets.

The U.S. dollar began to displace the pound sterling as international reserve currency from the 1920s since it emerged from the First World War relatively unscathed and since the United States was a significant recipient of wartime gold inflows. After the U.S. emerged as an even stronger global superpower during the Second World War, the Bretton Woods Agreement of 1944 established the post-war international monetary system, with the U.S. dollar ascending to become the world's primary reserve currency for international trade, and the only post-war currency linked to gold at $35 per troy ounce.

After the establishment of the Bretton Woods system, the US dollar is used as the medium for international trade. The United States Department of the Treasury exercises considerable oversight over the SWIFT financial transfers network, and consequently has a huge sway on the global financial transactions systems, with the ability to impose sanctions on foreign entities and individuals.

Devaluation of the dollar 

Under the Bretton Woods system established after World War II, the value of gold was fixed to $35 per ounce, and the value of the U.S. dollar was thus anchored to the value of gold. Rising government spending in the 1960s, however, led to doubts about the ability of the United States to maintain this convertibility, gold stocks dwindled as banks and international investors began to convert dollars to gold, and as a result, the value of the dollar began to decline. Facing an emerging currency crisis and the imminent danger that the United States would no longer be able to redeem dollars for gold, gold convertibility was finally terminated in 1971 by President Nixon, resulting in the "Nixon shock".

The value of the U.S. dollar was therefore no longer anchored to gold, and it fell upon the Federal Reserve to maintain the value of the U.S. currency. The Federal Reserve, however, continued to increase the money supply, resulting in stagflation and a rapidly declining value of the U.S. dollar in the 1970s. This was largely due to the prevailing economic view at the time that inflation and real economic growth were linked (the Phillips curve), so inflation was regarded as relatively benign. Between 1965 and 1981, the U.S. dollar lost two thirds of its value.

Central bank reserves 
According to the IMF's Currency Composition of Official Foreign Exchange Reserves (COFER) survey the share of reserves held in U.S. dollars by central banks fell from 71 percent in 1999 to 59 percent in 2021.

Regional developments 
On March 17, 2022, Anatoly Aksakov, Chairman of the State Duma Committee on the Financial Market, announced that the Bank of Russia and the People's Bank of China are working on connecting the Russian and Chinese financial messaging systems. He also pointed to the beginning of the development of information transfer schemes using blockchains, including the digital ruble and the digital yuan. On March 31, 2022, the Economic Times published information that India has offered Russia a new transaction system with the transfer of trade to the ruble and SPFS, which will work through the Reserve Bank of India and Russia's Vnesheconombank. According to the same data, the system will be put into operation within a week.

As academic Tim Beal summarizes, many commentators view the United States' overly broad imposition of financial sanctions as a factor increasing dedollarisation because of responses like the Russian-developed System for Transfers of Financial Messages (SPFS), the China-supported Cross-Border Interbank Payment System (CIPS), and the European Instrument in Support of Trade Exchanges (INSTEX) that followed the United States' withdrawal of from the Joint Comprehensive Plan of Action (JCPOA) with Iran.

Argentina 
In Jan 2023, Argentina and Brazil proposed a common currency for trade which is termed as Gaucho. Gaucho combines the currency of Argentina’s austral and Brazil’s cruzado.

Australia 
In 2013, Australia made an agreement with China to trade in national currencies.

Brazil 
In March 2013, during the BRICS summit, Brazil made an agreement with China to trade in Brazilian real and Chinese yuan

China 
Since 2011, China is gradually shifting from trade in US dollar and in favour of Chinese yuan. It made agreements with Australia, Russia, Japan, Brazil, and Iran to trade in national currencies. It has been reported that in the first quarter of 2020 the share of the dollar in the bilateral trade between China and Russia fell below 50 percent for the first time.

In 2015, China launched CIPS, a payment system which offers clearing and settlement services for its participants in cross-border Renminbi payments and trade as an alternative to SWIFT.

In December 2022 at China - GCC Summit, President Xi Jinping called for Oil trade payments to be settled at yuan. Foreign Minister Wang Yi stated that Chinese-Arab relations experienced a "historic improvement."

Egypt 
In May 2022, Egyptian Minister of Finance Mohamed Maait announced the intention to issue bonds in yuan to raise capital as an mechanism to diversify the sources of finance.

European Union 
Since the end of 2019, the EU countries established INSTEX, a European special-purpose vehicle (SPV) to facilitate non-USD and non-SWIFT transactions with Iran to avoid breaking U.S. sanctions. On 11 February 2019, Russian deputy foreign minister Sergei Ryabkov stated that Russia would be interested in participating in INSTEX.

In April 2022, Four European gas companies made trade payment settlements in rubles.

Ghana 
In 24 November 2022, Vice President Mahamudu Bawumia stated that they are working to buy Oil in Gold and he added "The barter of gold for oil represents a major structural change."

India
Before 1991 Soviet Union and India traded in rupee-ruble exchange during Cold War as both belong to this block. Mutual trading between India and Russia is done mostly in rubles and rupees instead of dollars and euros.

In March 2022, India and Russia entered for a RupeeRuble Trade Arrangement. In December 2022, Sri Lanka and Mauritius started using the rupee for international trade. Tajikistan, Cuba, Luxembourg and Sudan have also shown interest to use this mechanism.

Iran 

In March 2018, China started buying oil in gold-backed yuan.

In March 2020, the first Iran-EU INSTEX transaction was concluded. It covered an import of medical equipment to combat the COVID-19 outbreak in Iran. european countries said on march 2023 they had decided to end a scheme put in place in 2019 to allow trade with Iran and protect companies doing business with it from US sanctions, but it was only a single one transaction traded. Ali Khamenei, Leader of the Islamic Revolution, on Thursday likened the European financial mechanism for trade with Iran to a “bitter joke".

In July 2022, Russia and Iran made modifications in their Bilateral trade to reduce the dependency of US dollar. The new monetary system could mean the debts can be settled in their own countries and could reduce the demand for US dollars by 3 billion a year.

In January 2023, Russia and Iran were planning to trade with gold backed cryptocurrencies as an alternative to US Dollar.

Japan 
In 2011, Japan made an agreement with China to trade in national currencies. Sino-Japanese trade had a value of US $300 billion.

Kazakhstan 
In December 2015, the Kazakhstan government and national bank announced plans to reduce dollar dependency and strengthen the national currency. The joint statement of Kazakhstan government and national bank stated that their intent is to strengthen their national currency rather than focus on eliminating US dollars.

In August 2016, after inflation surged to a 6-year high, the Kazakhstan central bank governor stated that it is a necessity to kickstart dedollarisation.

Myanmar 
In September 2022, Chairman of State Administration Council Min Aung Hlaing stated that they are planning to reduce US dollar reliance and to include trade in other Foreign currencies. Apart from this there had been discussion to use Mir Payments system for payments.

Russia 
Russia accelerated the process of dedollarisation in 2014 as a result of worsening relations with the West. In 2017, SPFS, a Russian equivalent of the SWIFT financial transfer system, was developed by the Central Bank of Russia. The system had been in development since 2014, after the United States government threatened to disconnect Russia from the SWIFT system. Lukoil, a state-owned company, had announced that it will find a replacement for the dollar.

In June 2021, Russia stated it will eliminate the dollar from its National Wealth Fund to reduce vulnerability to Western sanctions just two weeks before President Vladimir Putin held his first summit meeting with U.S. leader Joe Biden.

In March 23, 2022, Vladimir Putin signed an order forbidding "non-friendly" countries (including EU countries, United States and Japan) from buying Russian gas in any other currency besides Russian ruble in the wake of sanctions given in aftermath of 2022 Russian invasion of Ukraine.

In September 2022, Gazprom CEO Alexey Miller said that they have signed an agreement to make trade payments in rubles and yuan instead of US dollars.

In November 2022, Russian Deputy Prime Minister Alexander Novak said that all gas supplied to China via Siberia are settled in yuan and rubles.

Russia had been planning to buy more yuan in the foreign exchange market in 2023 for trade settlements. The Russian Finance Ministry and Central Bank of Russia stated that it would sell around 54.5 billion rubles in foreign currency from January 2023.

Saudi Arabia 
In March 2022, multiple reports claimed that Saudi Arabia was in talks with China about trading Saudi oil and gas to China in Chinese yuan instead of dollars.

In January 2023, Finance Minister Mohammed Al-Jadaan stated that it is open to trade in other currencies besides the US dollar, and this expression is considered to be the first time in 48 years.

Turkey 
In August 2022, Turkey and Russia agreed for half of natural gas trade in rubles.

Venezuela 
In August 2018, Venezuela declared that it would price its oil in euros, yuan, rubles, and other currencies.

Zimbabwe 
After a year of the RTGS Dollar having been the only legal tender, Zimbabwe adopted dollarization due to hyperinflation. In June 2019, it also reduced the usage of a multicurrency system and preferred to switch to the US dollar. In an interview with former Finance Minister Tendai Biti, he pointed out that dedollarisation has failed dismally.

In 2022, Zimbabwe introduced a new form of currency made by gold, the Mosi-oa-Tunya, to reduce inflation since the local currency had considerably weakened. The governor of the Reserve Bank John Mangudya said that the gold coins will contain one troy ounce of 22-carat gold, and that trade could be carried out both locally and internationally.

See also 
 World currency
 Currency substitution
 Khaleeji (currency)
 Modern gold dinar

References 

International trade
Bilateral trading relationships